The 1946 Arizona Wildcats football team represented the University of Arizona in the Border Conference during the 1946 college football season.  In their sixth season under head coach Mike Casteel, the Wildcats compiled a 4–4–2 record (2–2–1 against Border opponents), finished in fourth place in the conference, and outscored their opponents, 218 to 136. The team captain was Virgil Floyd Marsh.  The team played its home games in Varsity Stadium in Tucson, Arizona.

Schedule

References

Arizona
Arizona Wildcats football seasons
Arizona Wildcats football